World Heroes Anthology, known in Japan as , is a game compilation, which includes all four games from ADK's World Heroes series, which were a part of the early Neo Geo titles from SNK. The four games presented here World Heroes, World Heroes 2, World Heroes 2 Jet, and World Heroes Perfect. The compilation was released exclusively for the PlayStation 2 on March 11, 2008.<ref>Official website of World Heroes Anthology.</ref>

Story
The main storyline is based around Dr. Brown who has created a time machine able to bring together fighters from various times in history, with the goal of determining the greatest fighter of all time. As the games focus on different time frames throughout history, most of its characters are based on real people.World HeroesWorld Heroes 2World Heroes 2 JetWorld Heroes Perfect''

Reception

The game received "mixed" reviews according to video game review aggregator Metacritic.

References

External links
 
 World Heroes Anthology website

2007 video games
Fighting games
SNK Playmore games
PlayStation 2-only games
PlayStation 2 games
SNK game compilations
Multiplayer and single-player video games
Takara video games